Miss Venezuela 1956 was the fourth edition of Miss Venezuela pageant held at Tamanaco Intercontinental Hotel in Caracas, Venezuela, on June 30, 1956, after days of events. The winner of the pageant was Blanca Heredia, Miss Distrito Federal.

Results
Miss Venezuela 1956 - Blanca Heredia (Miss Distrito Federal)
1st runner-up - Celsa Pieri (Miss Sucre) to Miss World 1956
2nd runner-up - Elizabeth Rotundo (Miss Aragua)
3rd runner-up - Alida Marquis (Miss Departamento Libertador)
4th runner-up - Beatriz Gutiérrez (Miss Caracas)

Delegates

 Miss Amazonas - Beatriz Bello
 Miss Aragua - Elizabeth Rotundo
 Miss Barinas - Lourdes Agostini Oquendo
 Miss Caracas - Beatriz Gutiérrez Padrón
 Miss Delta Amacuro - Alba Guevara
 Miss Departamento Libertador - Alida Márquiz
 Miss Distrito Federal - Blanca (Blanquita) Heredia Osío
 Miss Guárico - Belén Infante
 Miss Lara - Fanny Torrealba
 Miss Maracaibo - Lady Josefina Andrade
 Miss Miranda  - Aracelis Mora
 Miss Nueva Esparta - Ennia Mendoza
 Miss Sucre - Celsa Drucila Pieri Pérez 
 Miss Trujillo - Lilian Haack
 Miss Zulia - Iris Rubio

External links
Miss Venezuela official website

1956 beauty pageants
1956 in Venezuela